The Sri Lankan cricket team toured South Africa during the 1997–98 season, playing two Tests from 19 to 30 March 1998. Prior to the series, Sri Lanka had toured South Africa in the 1994–95 season, playing only One Day Internationals in the Mandela Trophy. This was therefore the first Test series between the two in South Africa.

Sri Lanka was led by Arjuna Ranatunga while South Africa was led by Hansie Cronje. The tour began with a Test series consisting of two matches. South Africa won both matches, winning the series 2–0. At the end of the series, Darryl Cullinan of South Africa emerged as the top run-scorer with 284 runs, with an average of 71.00. Muttiah Muralitharan and Allan Donald finished the series as top wicket-takers capturing 16 and 14 wickets respectively. Cullinan was named "man of the series".

The Test series was followed by a triangular One-Day tournament, which included Pakistan as the third team. Sri Lanka were excluded at the group stage, having won as many matches as Pakistan, but having a worse head-to-head record against them.

Squads

Tour matches

Three-day: Gauteng v Sri Lankans

50-over: North West v Sri Lankans

Three-day: Boland v Sri Lankans

Test matches

1st Test

2nd Test

See also
1997–98 Standard Bank International One-Day Series

References

External links
 Tour home at ESPNcricinfo
 Sri Lanka in South Africa, Mar-Apr 1998 at ESPNcricinfo archive
 
 

1998 in South African cricket
South African cricket seasons from 1970–71 to 1999–2000
1997-98
International cricket competitions from 1997–98 to 2000
1998 in Sri Lankan cricket